Maisy Leigh Gibson is an Australian cricketer, who plays as a left-handed batter and right-arm leg break bowler for the Hobart Hurricanes and the Tasmanian Tigers. She has previously played for Sydney Thunder and the New South Wales Breakers.

Career
In 2010, she was the first female to captain a team at the Lismore under-12 cricket carnival when she captained Hunter Valley under-12s. Gibson has played Sydney grade level cricket for Singleton, and Hunter Region. 

Gibson played in four Women's Big Bash League seasons for Sydney Thunder, taking 36 wickets in total. She was part of the Sydney Thunder (WBBL) team that won the 2015–16 Women's Big Bash League season. She took 13 wickets in the tournament at an average of 11.30 and an economy rate of 5.60. In 2016, she was given a professional New South Wales Breakers contract, which allowed her to move to Sydney. She was later named in the squad for the final of the 2016–17 Women's National Cricket League season. 

Ahead of the 2019–20 Women's National Cricket League season and 2019–20 Women's Big Bash League season, she moved to Tasmania, and signed for the Tasmanian Tigers and the Hobart Hurricanes. She took 10 wickets in the 2019–20 WNCL, and in May 2020, she was named Tasmanian women's player of the season.

References

External links

Maisy Gibson at Cricket Australia

1996 births
Australian women cricketers
Living people
New South Wales Breakers cricketers
Nottinghamshire women cricketers
Sydney Thunder (WBBL) cricketers
Hobart Hurricanes (WBBL) cricketers
Tasmanian Tigers (women's cricket) cricketers
Cricketers from New South Wales